R1 is a Czech private television station.

R1 is the third channel of TV Prima. This channel is compound from content of members of the group R1 (R1 Vřídlo, R1 Zak, ...). Members of group R1 are small regional TV stations, which share their program with TV Prima most of the time. R1 was broadcast in Czech DVB-T multiplex 2 on the same position as Prima Cool. R1 broadcast between 6:00am and 11:00am. Prima Cool broadcast usually from 11:30am to 1:00am.

Since 8 March 2011 TV R1 transformed into a channel named Prima Love. Prima Love left Prima Cool and started broadcasts in Czech DVB-T multiplex 3. R1 programme is broadcasting between 6:00am and 8:00am.

History
TV Prima had licence for TV station named Prima Club. It should have been woman-oriented station (in contrast with Prima Cool). But in the time of financial crisis, the Prima Club project was canceled and replaced by project R1 with no expenditures.

On 8 March 2011 TV Prima relaunched the Prima Club project, renamed it to Prima Love and started broadcasting in Czech DVB-T multiplex 3 (it is the only channel in this multiplex). Programme of TV R1 remains on new channel between 6:00am and 8:00am.

External links
 Official site

Television stations in the Czech Republic
Modern Times Group
Television channels and stations established in 2009
Prima televize